Jose Francisco Oliveros (September 11, 1946 – May 11, 2018) was a Filipino Roman Catholic prelate, who served as the fourth Bishop of the Roman Catholic Diocese of Malolos.

Life
Jose was born on September 11, 1946. His parents were Vicente Oliveros and Angelina Francisco, from Quezon in the eponymous province.

He was ordained a priest on November 28, 1970 in Luneta (Rizal Park) Manila by Pope Paul VI. Pope John Paul II appointed him on February 2, 2000, Bishop of the Diocese of Boac. He was consecrated bishop on March 20, 2000 in the Cathedral of San Diego de Alcala in Gumaca, Quezon by Archbishop Antonio Franco, former Apostolic Nuncio to the Philippines. The principal co-consecrators were Archbishop Gaudencio Borbon Rosales, then-Archbishop of Lipa and Bishop Emilio Zurbano Marquez, then-Bishop of Gumaca.

On May 14, 2004, Bishop Oliveros was appointed Bishop of Malolos. He was installed on August 5, 2004 at Cathedral-Basilica of the Immaculate Conception (Malolos Cathedral) Malolos City.

He died on May 11, 2018 after a lengthy illness, particularly prostate cancer, just 4 months before his 72nd Birthday. He is the first Bishop of Malolos to die in office. Among his last activities are the Episcopal ordination of Rev. Msgr. Bartolome Santos as the 5th Bishop of Iba which he celebrated alongside Archbishop Florentino Lavarias of the Archdiocese of San Fernando, Pampanga and Manila Archbishop Luis Antonio Cardinal Tagle which took place at the Malolos Cathedral on April 30, 2018, and his last 2 masses at the San Miguel Arcangel Parishes in the towns of Marilao and San Miguel held on May 8, 3 days before his death. He is buried at the crypt of the Malolos Cathedral.

See also
Catholic Church in the Philippines

References

1946 births
2018 deaths
People from Bulacan
People from Marinduque
People from Quezon
21st-century Roman Catholic bishops in the Philippines
Deaths from prostate cancer
Deaths from cancer in the Philippines